Lobazovka is a rural locality in Lobazovsky Selsoviet Rural Settlement, Oktyabrsky District, Kursk Oblast, Russia. Population:

Geography 
The village is located on the Vorobzha River (a left tributary of the Seym River), 66 km from the Russia–Ukraine border, 21 km south-west of Kursk, 8 km south of the district center – the urban-type settlement Pryamitsyno, 0.5 km from the selsoviet center – Zhuravlino.

 Climate
Lobazovka has a warm-summer humid continental climate (Dfb in the Köppen climate classification).

Transport 

The rural locality is situated 32 km from Kursk Vostochny Airport, 110 km from Belgorod International Airport and 230 km from Voronezh Peter the Great Airport.

References

Notes

Sources

Rural localities in Oktyabrsky District, Kursk Oblast